Lyceum Hall is a historic commercial building in downtown Lewiston, Maine, United States.  Built in 1872, the  Second Empire hall is one of the city's few surviving designs of Charles F. Douglas, a leading Maine architect of the period, and for a number of years housed the city's only performance venue. The building was listed on the National Register of Historic Places in 1986.

Description and history
Lyceum Hall is located on the west side of Lisbon Street, the principal commercial street in downtown Lewiston.  It is nominally a -story masonry structure, with a mansard roof providing space for a full fourth floor.  The building facade is symmetrical, with a central one-bay section flanked by identical two-bay sections.  The central section has the recessed building entrance on the first floor, and narrow round-arch windows on the second and third floors, set in a recessed brick panel.  The remaining ground-floor bays all have commercial glass storefront windows, articulated by stone or brick piers.  The outer bays on the second floor have segmented-arch windows, while those on the third floor are round-arched.  The fourth floor dormers have segmented-arch windows.  The main cornice (below the steep mansard roof section) is bracketed and dentillated, and a secondary cornice at the transition between the roof sections is dentillated.

The hall was built in 1872 to a design by Charles F. Douglas, a prominent local architect.  Douglas designed a number of Lewiston's downtown buildings during a flurry of construction after the American Civil War, but this is the only one to survive relatively intact.  It originally housed a 1000-seat theater on the third floor, which was the city's only public performance venue until the construction of the city's Music Hall.  The building underwent a full restoration in the 1980s.

See also
National Register of Historic Places listings in Androscoggin County, Maine

References

Buildings and structures completed in 1872
Commercial buildings on the National Register of Historic Places in Maine
Buildings and structures in Lewiston, Maine
National Register of Historic Places in Lewiston, Maine